Mesocolpia peremptata is a moth in the family Geometridae. It is found in Cameroon, the Democratic Republic of Congo, Equatorial Guinea (Bioko), Ivory Coast, Senegal and Sierra Leone.

References

External links

Moths described in 1862
Eupitheciini